The 1993 MAAC men's basketball tournament was held March 5–7, 1993 at Knickerbocker Arena in Albany, New York.

Top-seeded Manhattan defeated  in the championship game, 68–67, to win their first MAAC men's basketball tournament.

The Jaspers received an automatic bid to the 1993 NCAA tournament.

Format
All eight of the conference's members participated in the tournament field. They were seeded based on regular season conference records.

Bracket

References

MAAC men's basketball tournament
1992–93 Metro Atlantic Athletic Conference men's basketball season